"Love's Not a Competition (But I'm Winning)" is a song by English band Kaiser Chiefs, featured on the band's second studio album, Yours Truly, Angry Mob. It was released as a collector's edition 7" only single on 12 November 2007, with The Little Ones' cover of "Everything Is Average Nowadays" as a B-side.

Chris Moyles has a running gag on his show, where Comedy Dave has likened the song to a-ha's "The Living Daylights".

The song's music video was directed by Jim Canty. It was filmed in September 2007 at Columbus Circle in New York City.

The song was covered by Paramore on Radio 1's Live Lounge on 1 February 2008.

At the time it was the band's lowest charting single, reflecting that it was released as the fourth single from the highly successful Yours Truly, Angry Mob and it was only a limited release. It peaked at #112 in the UK Singles Chart.

Track listing 
7":
 Kaiser Chiefs - "Love's Not a Competition (But I'm Winning)" - 3:17
 The Little Ones - "Everything is Average Nowadays" (Kaiser Chiefs Cover)

Notes

External links
www.kaiserchiefs.co.uk

2007 singles
Kaiser Chiefs songs
Song recordings produced by Stephen Street
2006 songs
Songs written by Ricky Wilson (British musician)
Songs written by Simon Rix
Songs written by Andrew White (musician)
Songs written by Nick Hodgson
Songs written by Nick "Peanut" Baines